Little Nemo: The Dream Master is a platform game released on the NES in 1990 by Capcom. It is based on the Japanese animated film, Little Nemo: Adventures in Slumberland from Tokyo Movie Shinsha, which itself is based on the comic strip Little Nemo in Slumberland by Winsor McCay. The game's music was composed by Junko Tamiya, credited in the game as "Gonzou".

The game revolves around a young boy in his own surreal dreams as he journeys to Slumberland. Nemo can ride certain animals such as a frog, a gorilla, or a mole, by feeding them candy. Each animal has its own skills needed to complete each level. The purpose of the game is to travel to the Nightmare land to rescue Morpheus, the king of Slumberland, from the clutches of the evil Nightmare King.

Gameplay

In Little Nemo: The Dream Master, the player controls Nemo as he proceeds through side-scrolling, 2D levels. In each level, Nemo must collect a specific number of keys, which are generally scattered throughout the rather large levels. The number of keys needed to beat each level is not indicated to the player until reaching the exit at the end of the level, which has a corresponding number of locks. The player must proceed through each level, typically left to right but also up and down, searching for keys.

Throughout each level the player encounters several animals, which, after being fed, will allow Nemo to use their powers. A similar game mechanic would be used in Kirby's Adventure three years later. Using the powers of some animals is necessary, while others simply make things a little easier. The animal's life-bars often differ from Nemo's, with some animals possessing extra health bars. Such abilities are vital, as many challenging obstacles exist throughout the game, and enemies are virtually almost infinite. As such, Little Nemo is generally regarded as a highly difficult game.

Reception 

Little Nemo: The Dream Master on the Nintendo Entertainment System received positive reception from critics. Electronic Gaming Monthlys four reviewers described the game as "Rescue Rangers in a dream world" and praised its Disney-esque pastel-style graphics, concepts, gameplay, frenetic action and constant challenge. GamePros The Unknown Gamer also commended the title for its visuals, sound, gameplay, fun factor and challenge. Brazilian magazine VideoGame gave high marks to its difficulty, graphics, music and sound effects. Hobby Consolas José Luis Sanz gave positive remarks to the colorful and high-quality visuals, sound, gameplay and originality, but noted its difficulty and criticized the scrolling for being occasionally faulty. 

Player Ones Christophe Delpierre highly praised Little Nemo: The Dream Master for the colorful graphics, animated characters, sound, well thought-out difficulty progression, longevity, controls and lack of sprite flickering. Mean Machines Rob Bright and Radion Automatic disagreed with Delpierre on most points, criticizing the sprite flickering when too many objects are present on-screen, collision detection issues and numerous instances of instant death traps. Nevertheless, they commended the game for its presentation, cartoon-style visuals, "cute" and "cheery" sound design, responsive controls and ability to ride animals. Video Games Jan Barysch gave positive remarks to the title's audiovisual presentation, but noted its steep difficulty curve and criticized the controls for being somewhat unresponsive. AllGames Christian Huey regarded it as "a wonderfully creative side-scrolling platformer", praising the cartoon-esque graphic and "ethereal" music, though he noted that its gameplay was basic.

Retrospective coverage 
Retrospective commentaries for Little Nemo: The Dream Master have been more mixed. In 2009, IGN placed the title on their "Top 100 NES Games" list at #68, but remarked that "the game's advanced difficulty level no doubt took some unsuspecting youngsters by surprise." In contrast, Gaming Bus Christopher Bowen wrote that Little Nemo was "punishingly difficult at times, even by NES games standards." Bowen also wrote that the game belonged in "the second tier of Capcom licensed games" alongside Adventures in the Magic Kingdom. Hardcore Gaming 101s Kurt Kalata felt that the ability to ride animals was awkward, due to each one featuring disadvantages, and criticized the key hunting gameplay portion to be annoying. Kalata also noted that its soundtrack was "fairly unremarkable" aside from certain music pieces, but he ultimately regarded it to be a decent platform title. Anime News Networks Todd Ciolek felt that the NES version "had greater traction" compared to its arcade counterpart, stating that the rideable animals turned each stage into a puzzle due to their abilities. Digital Trends Steven Petite called it one of the best NES games of all time.

Notes

References

External links 

 Little Nemo: The Dream Master at GameFAQs
 Little Nemo: The Dream Master at Giant Bomb
 Little Nemo: The Dream Master at MobyGames

1990 video games
Capcom games
Nintendo Entertainment System games
Nintendo Entertainment System-only games
Platform games
Single-player video games
Video games about children
Video games about dreams
Video games based on anime and manga
Video games based on films
Video games developed in Japan
Little Nemo